Bodyrock may refer to:

Body Rock, a 1984 film
Bodyrock (album), a 1989 album by Lee Aaron
"Bodyrock (song)", a 1999 song by Moby
BodyRockers, a music group
BodyRock Sport, a sports bra manufacturer